Nesolechia may refer to:

 Nesolechia (fungus), a genus of fungi in the family Parmeliaceae
 Nesolechia (moth), a genus of moths in the family Gelechiidae